Aweke Ayalew (born 23 February 1993) is an Ethiopian-born Bahraini middle-distance and long-distance runner. He competed in the 5000 and 10,000 metres at the 2015 World Championships in Beijing.

International competitions

1Representing Asia-Pacific

Personal bests
Outdoor
3000 metres – 7:49.09 (Székesfehérvár 2014)
5000 metres – 13:05.00 (Rabat 2013)
10,000 metres – 29:14.55 (Beijing 2015)
Half marathon – 1:03:01 (Copenhagen 2014)

Indoor
5000 metres – 13:30.79 (Düsseldorf 2015)

References

External links

1993 births
Living people
Place of birth missing (living people)
Bahraini male long-distance runners
Bahraini male cross country runners
Ethiopian male cross country runners
Ethiopian male long-distance runners
World Athletics Championships athletes for Bahrain
Asian Cross Country Championships winners